Al-Qa'im border crossing between Syria and Iraq is one of the major supply routes across the Middle East. It connects the town of Abu Kamal in Syria's Deir ez-Zor Governorate to the city of Husaybah, in the Al-Qa'im District of Iraq's Anbar Governorate. The border crossing is about 450 km from Syria's capital Damascus and 340 km from the Iraqi capital Baghdad.

On 30 September 2019, Iraq reopened the border crossing after eight years of closure due to Syrian Civil War and Iraqi Civil War.

See also
 Iraq–Syria border

References

Deir ez-Zor Governorate
Iraq–Syria border crossings